René-Pierre Signé (born 16 September 1930) was a member of the Senate of France from 1986 to 2011, representing the Nièvre department. He is a member of the Socialist Party.

References
Page on the Senate website 

1930 births
Living people
French Senators of the Fifth Republic
Socialist Party (France) politicians
Senators of Nièvre
Place of birth missing (living people)